Xiangyan Temple is a famous Chinese Buddhist Temple in Xichuan County in southeastern Henan province, People's Republic of China.

History 
It was first built in Year 767 by Nanyang Huizhong,  the second year during Emperor Daizong's reign of the Tang Dynasty period (618-907) and it was named "Changshou Temple" then.

References

Buddhist temples in Nanyang, Henan
Major National Historical and Cultural Sites in Henan